Jaime García may refer to:

Jaime García (equestrian) (1910–1959), Spanish equestrian
Jaime García Añoveros (1932–2000), Spanish politician
Jaime García (footballer) (born 1977), Chilean football manager and former player
Jaime García (baseball) (born 1986), Mexican baseball player